Trane Whistle is an album by saxophonist Eddie "Lockjaw" Davis' Big Band with arrangements by Oliver Nelson and Ernie Wilkins recorded in 1960 and released on the Prestige label.

Reception

The Allmusic reviewer Scott Yanow stated: "Most significant is the inclusion of the original version of "Stolen Moments" (here called "The Stolen Moment" and predating the more famous Oliver Nelson recording by several months)".

In his February 1, 1962 review for DownBeat magazine Richard B. Hadlock wrote: "Perhaps the most significant aspect of this set is saxophonist Nelson's debut as a big-band arranger on four tracks."

Track listing 
All compositions and arrangements by Oliver Nelson except as indicated
 "Trane Whistle" - 6:19  
 "Whole Nelson" - 3:35  
 "You Are Too Beautiful" (Lorenz Hart, Richard Rodgers) - 5:11 (arr. by Ernie Wilkins)
 "The Stolen Moment" - 7:54  
 "Walk Away" - 5:27  
 "Jaws" (Eddie "Lockjaw" Davis) - 4:36 (arr. by Ernie Wilkins)

Personnel 
Eddie "Lockjaw" Davis - tenor saxophone
Clark Terry, Richard Williams, Bob Bryant - trumpet
Melba Liston, Jimmy Cleveland - trombone
Jerome Richardson, George Barrow - tenor saxophone, flute
Eric Dolphy, Oliver Nelson - alto saxophone
Bob Ashton - baritone saxophone
Richard Wyands - piano
Wendell Marshall - bass
Roy Haynes - drums
Oliver Nelson (tracks 1, 2, 4 & 5), Ernie Wilkins (tracks 3 & 6) - arranger

References 

Eddie "Lockjaw" Davis albums
1960 albums
Albums produced by Esmond Edwards
Albums recorded at Van Gelder Studio
Prestige Records albums
Albums arranged by Oliver Nelson